Howevalley is an unincorporated community in Hardin County, Kentucky, United States.

A post office operated in the community from 1852 to 1908. Howevalley (also historically spelled Howe's Valley and Howevalley) is situated in a valley of the same name, which in turn was named for John Howe, an early settler. John Howe was in the American Revolutionary War and was given the land for his work.

References

Unincorporated communities in Hardin County, Kentucky
Unincorporated communities in Kentucky